Michael John Kenstowicz (born August 18, 1945) is an American linguist and professor of linguistics at MIT Department of Linguistics and Philosophy.
He is best known for his works on phonetics and phonology. His book Phonology in Generative Grammar is a coursebook taught across the world in phonology courses.
He is an editor of Natural Language & Linguistic Theory since 1987.

Books
 Phonology in Generative Grammar, Blackwell Publications 1994
 Generative Phonology: Description and Theory, with Charles Kisseberth, Academic Press 1979
 Topics in Phonological Theory, with Charles Kisseberth, Academic Press 1977

References

External links
Kenstowicz's CV

Linguists from the United States
MIT School of Humanities, Arts, and Social Sciences faculty
American phonologists
Living people
University of Illinois Urbana-Champaign faculty
1945 births
San Jose State University alumni
University of Illinois alumni